Bloodbath at the House of Death is a 1984 British comedy horror film directed by Ray Cameron and starring the comedian Kenny Everett and featuring Vincent Price. It is an over-the-top spoof loosely inspired by The Amityville Horror and other horror films from the same period.

Plot 
The film opens in 1975 at a place called Headstone Manor, which is being used as a "businessman's weekend retreat and girls' summer camp". A few minutes into the film, a group of satanic monks enter the house and kill 18 of its occupants.

In 1983, Doctor Lukas Mandeville (Kenny Everett) and Doctor Barbara Coyle (Pamela Stephenson) are sent to investigate radioactive readings in the area that have been traced to Headstone Manor, now known by locals as the House of Death. Along with several other scientists, Mandeville and Coyle set up their equipment in the house, while the Sinister Man (Vincent Price), a 700-year-old Satanic priest, prepares a rite in the nearby woods to purge the house of its unwanted guests.

During this time, Mandeville reveals that he was once a successful German surgeon named Ludwig Manheim, who was reduced to "smart-arse paranormal research crap" after a humiliation in the past. Coyle also encounters a poltergeist, and the two engage in sexual intercourse.

Several satanic clones of Mandeville, Coyle and the other scientists enter the house, and begin killing off the originals and taking their place. When Coyle is about to be killed, she is abducted by the poltergeist but also cloned. The satanic monks then take off in a spaceship, revealing that these monks are aliens using the house for their activities on Earth. The film ends with the spaceship soaring into the skies.

Cast 
 Kenny Everett as Dr. Lukas Mandeville
 Pamela Stephenson as Dr. Barbara Coyle
 Vincent Price as Sinister Man
 Gareth Hunt as Elliot Broome
 Don Warrington as Stephen Wilson
 John Fortune as John Harrison
 Sheila Steafel as Sheila Finch
 John Stephen Hill as Henry Noland
 Cleo Rocos as Deborah Kedding
 Graham Stark as The Blind Man
 Pat Ashton as Barmaid
 David Lodge as Inspector Goule
 Debbie Linden as Attractive Girl
 Tim Barrett as Doctor
 Barry Cryer as Police Inspector
 Anna Dawson as Nurse
 Gordon Rollings as Man at bar

Production 

Bloodbath at the House of Death was written by Ray Cameron and Barry Cryer, who had previously co-written the 1978 to 1981 Thames Television comedy series The Kenny Everett Video Show. Laurence Myers agreed to produce the film when the makers almost lost their financing. The film was shot entirely on location at the town of Potters Bar in Hertfordshire, England. Michael McIntyre (the son of director Ray Cameron) reveals in his autobiography that he was the voice of E.T. Myers recalls that the film did not make sense; he screened the film for censor  James Ferman, who enjoyed the film, but believed that the reels were played in the wrong order.

Release 

The film was released in the United Kingdom by Thorn EMI. It was produced in the aftermath of Kenny Everett's outburst at the Young Conservatives conference in which he called for the bombing of Russia; as a result, the media frequently referenced the film in negative context in relation to the outburst during the production, and film critics reviewed the film harshly. Film critic Martyn Auty wrote: "Presumably intended as high camp; looks like low-grade Carry On." It was given an 18 certificate in the United Kingdom.

The film was released on DVD in the United Kingdom in July 2008, with a re-rating to a 15 certificate. A novelization of the film was also published, which named Marcel Wave (one of Kenny Everett's TV characters) as the resident who underwent spontaneous combustion.

References

External links 
 Bloodbath at the House of Death at the British Film Institute
 
 
 
 The films that were buried alive, The Guardian, August 22, 2008

1983 films
1984 horror films
1980s comedy horror films
British haunted house films
British parody films
British comedy horror films
Films set in 1975
Films set in 1983
Films set in country houses
Films shot in Hertfordshire
1983 comedy films
1980s English-language films
1980s British films